Gava Sara may refer to:
 Bala Gava Sara
 Gava Sara-ye Olya
 Pain Gava Sara